The 2018–19 Philadelphia Flyers season was the 52nd season for the National Hockey League franchise that was established on June 5, 1967. The Flyers were eliminated from playoff contention on March 30, 2019, after a 5–2 loss to the Carolina Hurricanes.

Standings

Schedule and results

Preseason
The preseason schedule was published on June 15, 2018.

Regular season
The regular season schedule was published on June 21, 2018.

Player statistics

Skaters

Goaltenders

†Denotes player spent time with another team before joining the Flyers. Stats reflect time with the Flyers only.
‡Denotes player was traded mid-season. Stats reflect time with the Flyers only.
Bold/italics denotes franchise record.

Awards and records

Awards

Records

Among the team records set during the 2018–19 season was for the most shots on goal during a single period (28) on February 11. The Flyers’ four total shootouts during the season and one shootout loss are both the fewest in team history.

Suspensions and fines

Transactions
The Flyers have been involved in the following transactions during the 2018–19 season.

Trades

Players acquired

Players lost

Signings

Draft picks

Below are the Philadelphia Flyers' selections at the 2018 NHL Entry Draft, which was held on June 22 and 23, 2018, at the American Airlines Center in Dallas, Texas.

Notes

References
General
 
 
 

Specific

Philadelphia Flyers seasons
Philadelphia Flyers
Flyers
Flyers